Abandon Your Friends is the third studio album by American post-hardcore band, From Autumn to Ashes. Released on August 30, 2005, it is the band's second album on Vagrant Records.

Sound
The album shows a slight departure from their traditional sound. The CD has an increased focus on drummer/vocalist, Francis Mark; after the release of the album it was confirmed by the band (after Benjamin Perri had left) that this was due to Ben not contributing as much lyrically or vocally to the album as with previous efforts, and his discontent about being in the band at the time. The album lyrics were mainly written by the band without Benjamin Perri, which may explain why the lyrics have a different slant on them than previous FATA albums. Also contrary to their previous two albums, Melanie Wills of One True Thing is absent on this release.

Background and release
It has also been said that Josh Eppard of Coheed and Cambria is responsible for naming the song "Placentapede".  It was said that when at a festival with Coheed & Cambria, FATA planned to play the song live, and they didn't have a name for it because the album wasn't out yet and the song was still in its early stages.  They went to Coheed and Cambria's bus and asked Josh what was the first thing that came to mind, and he responded with "Placentapede".

After the release of the album, From Autumn to Ashes recorded the video for "Where Do You Draw The Line".

The artwork on this album was done by artist Chuck Anderson.

Track listing
All music composed by From Autumn to Ashes. All lyrics by Francis Mark except where noted.

Personnel
Credits adapted from AllMusic.
From Autumn to Ashes
 Francis Mark – drums, clean vocals, screamed vocals
 Brian Deneeve – guitar, piano, backing vocals
 Benjamin Perri – screamed vocals
 Jon Cox – guitar
 Josh Newton – bass, backing vocals

Additional personnel
 Chuck Anderson – Artwork, design
 Eric Armstrong – Assistant engineer
 Chris Crippin – Drum technician
 GGGarth – Audio production, producer, backing vocals
 Ben Kaplan – Digital editing, programming
 Richard Leighton – Guitar technician
 Dean Maher – Audio engineer, engineer
 Brian McTernan – Editing, engineer
 James Morin – Assistant engineer
 Irene Richter – Management
 Rob Stephanson – Assistant engineer
 Andy VanDette – Digital editing
 Howie Weinberg – Mastering
 Josh Wilbur – Engineer, mixing

References

From Autumn to Ashes albums
2005 albums
Albums produced by Garth Richardson
Vagrant Records albums
Albums produced by Brian McTernan